The year 1517 in science and technology included a number of events, some of which are listed here.

Medicine
  A third epidemic of sweating sickness in England hits Oxford and Cambridge.
 German surgeon Hans von Gersdorff publishes his Feldbuch der Wundarzney ("Field book of surgery").

Births
 June 29 – Rembert Dodoens, Flemish physician and botanist (died 1585)
 October 5 – Leonardo Fioravanti, Bolognese physician (died 1588)
 Pierre Belon, French naturalist (died 1564)
 Jacques Pelletier du Mans, French mathematician (died 1582)

Deaths
 Luca Pacioli, Florentine mathematician (b. c.1447)

 
16th century in science
1510s in science